Martin Wilhelm Remus von Woyrsch (4 February 1847 – 6 August 1920) was a Prussian field marshal, a member of the Prussian House of Lords from 1908 to 1918, and an Ehrenkommendator or Honorary Commander of the Order of St. John.

Family 
Remus von Woyrsch was born at the estate Pilsnitz (Pilczyce, now part of Fabryczna) near Breslau (Wrocław) in Prussian Silesia. He came from old Bohemian nobility, first from South Bohemia and then from ca. 1500 in Troppau (Opava) in Moravian Silesia. He married Thekla von Massow (1854–1943) from East Prussia, on 26 September 1873 in Potsdam, Brandenburg. She was the daughter of the royal Prussian forester Hermann von Massow.

His nephew Udo von Woyrsch (1895–1983) was an SS Obergruppenführer and SS and Police Leader.

Career 
After Woyrsch finished high school in Breslau, he joined the 1st Potsdamer Garde-Grenadier Regiment on 5 April 1866. He served at the battle of Königgrätz in 1866. He later fought in the 1870–71 Franco-Prussian war where he was wounded but earned the Iron Cross. In 1901 Woyrsch was promoted to divisional commander. 

He retired in 1911 but was re-activated in August 1914 to command the Landwehr Corps and was quickly sent to help the Austro-Hungarian Army fighting in partitioned Poland. He came up to the Vistula, and then reinforced the left wing of the Austro-Hungarian army under General Viktor Dankl von Krasnik. In the three days of battle against the Imperial Russian army Woyrsch covered the retreat of the Austrians with his corps Landwehrkanal. A St. Petersburg newspaper wrote that: "Only the activity of the small Prussian Landwehr troops in this battle prevented the complete destruction of the Austrian army." Later he was included in Paul von Hindenburg's 9th Army. In July 1915 Woyrsch was involved in the breakthrough battle of Sienno near Wongrowitz (Wągrowiec). In 1916 he helped fight off the Russian Brusilov Offensive and in 1917 was promoted Generalfeldmarschall.

In 1920 Woyrsch retired, again, to his family estate at the castle Pilsnitz near Breslau. After his death the Silesian sculptor Paul Ondrusch created a wooden sculpture of Woyrsch to decorate the main hall inside the town hall of Leobschütz (Głubczyce). Woyrsch was portrayed as a knight wearing a coat and a chain mail, with his hands placed on a handle of a large sword resting against the ground.

Honours 
 Ehrenbürger (Honorary citizen) of Breslau
 Ehrenbürger (Honorary citizen) of Neisse
 Honorary doctorate from the Faculty of Philosophy

Orders and decorations 
 Iron Cross (1871)
 Order of the Black Eagle
 Order of Saint John (Johanniterorden)
 Pour le Mérite on 25 October 1914

References

Further reading

 Bruno Clemenz: Generalfeldmarschall von Woyrsch und seine Schlesier – Eigenhändige Auszüge aus seinem Kriegstagebuch. Carl Flemming Pub. Berlin:1919.
 Hahn-Butry, Jürgen (pub.): Preußisch-deutsche Feldmarschälle und Großadmirale. Safari Pub. Berlin:1938.
 Jürgen Hahn-Butry (Hrsg.): Preußisch-deutsche Feldmarschälle und Großadmirale. Safari, Berlin 1938.
 Genealogisches Handbuch des Adels, Adelige Häuser A Vol VII, p402, Vol 34. C. A. Starke Pub. Limburg (Lahn):1965. ISSN 0435-2408
 Acta Borussica Band 9 (1900–1909) (PDF-file. 2,74 MB)

1847 births
1920 deaths
19th-century German military personnel
Field marshals of Prussia
German Army generals of World War I
Field marshals of the German Empire
Recipients of the Pour le Mérite (military class)
Recipients of the Iron Cross (1870)
Prussian nobility
Members of the Prussian House of Lords
Silesian nobility
Bohemian nobility
German people of Czech descent
Military personnel from Wrocław
People from the Province of Silesia